Herbert Migdoll (born 1944) is an American painter, environmental installation artist and photographer, who, since 1968, has served as the company photographer for The Joffrey Ballet, and later its design director. His work has been featured on the covers of LIFE, TIME, New York Times Magazine, Horizon, Saturday Review, Show Magazine, Cue, USIA's America Magazine, and Dance Magazine. He is the author of the pictorial book Dancers Dancing. His work may be found most notably in the collection of New York's Museum of Modern Art.

He was Art Director of Dance Magazine for 25 years.

References 

1944 births
Living people
Cooper Union alumni
Artists from Jersey City, New Jersey
Artists from Chicago